Jimmy Jones may refer to:

Sports

Association football
Jimmy Jones (footballer, born 1876) (1876–?), English football player for Stoke
Jimmy Jones (footballer, born 1889) (1889–?), English football player for Blackpool and Bolton Wanderers
Jimmy Jones (footballer, born 1901) (1901–1976), Welsh international footballer
Jimmy Jones (footballer, born 1919) (1919–1976), Welsh footballer
Jimmy Jones (footballer, born 1928) (1928–2014), Northern Ireland international football player with Belfast Celtic and Glenavon
Jimmy Jones (footballer, born 1927) (1927–2015), English football goalkeeper for Accrington Stanley

Gridiron football
Jimmy Jones (wide receiver) (born 1941), former professional American football wide receiver
Jimmy Jones (quarterback) (born 1950), Canadian Football League player

Other sports
Jimmy Jones (Australian footballer) (1889–1955), Australian football player for Essendon
Jimmy Jones (baseball) (born 1964), Major League Baseball player
Jimmy Jones (basketball) (born 1945), former National Basketball Association player
Jimmy Jones (ice hockey) (born 1953), National Hockey League player 
Jimmy Jones (rugby league), rugby league footballer of the 1940s and 1950s
Jimmy Jones (tennis) (1912–1986), British tennis player and author
Horace A. Jones (1906–2001), known as Jimmy, U.S. Hall of Fame racehorse trainer
Melvin Nelson, American professional wrestler who competed as Jimmy Jones and Burrhead Jones

Other people
Jimmy Jones (comedian) (born 1938), British comedian
Jimmy Jones (singer) (1937–2012), American singer/songwriter
Jimmy Jones (pianist) (1918–1982), American jazz pianist
Jim Jones (rapper) (born 1976), American hip hop recording artist
James F. Jones (educator) (born 1947), former president of Trinity College in Hartford, CT; known to students as Jimmy Jones

See also
Jimmie Jones (disambiguation) 
Jim Jones (disambiguation)
James Jones (disambiguation)